The Xiaojiawan coal mine disaster was a mining accident which happened on 29 August 2012 at the Xiaojiawan coal mine, located in Panzhihua in Sichuan Province, China.  It was the deadliest mine accident since the 2009 Heilongjiang mine explosion.  As a result of a gas explosion in the Xiaojiawan coal mine, at least 45 miners were killed and 1 was still missing as of September 2.  51 were sent to hospital with seven in critical condition.  It was reported that 16 miners died from carbon monoxide poisoning, while three others died in hospital.

At the moment of explosion there were 154 miners working at the mine.  The shaft of the mine was severely destroyed.  As of 30 August 2012, more than 300 rescuers have taken part in the rescue operation.  Rescue operations are complicated due to high temperatures reaching .

Its trial run started in March 2011. In December 2011, it gained a safety license. The mine is owned by Zhengjin Industry and Trade Co. Ltd. Three owners of the mine were detained for investigation.

See also

List of coal mining accidents in China

References

Coal mining disasters in China
2012 mining disasters
2012 disasters in China
History of Sichuan
Panzhihua
2012 industrial disasters
August 2012 events in China